Danda is one of the administrative blocks of Garhwa district, Jharkhand state, India.

About Danda Garhwa Jharkhand 
Danda a Taluka/Block, close to Ranka, is located 40 km from Garhwa. Danda is located near koel river besides one of famous Lalgarh Village (nearest Railway Station) It's well covered by Vodafone, Airtel, Uninor, Reliance, BSNL, Aircel, Idea, Airtel 3G, like cellular networks.

Languages
Languages spoken here include Asuri, an Austroasiatic language spoken by approximately 17 000 in India, largely in the southern part of Palamu; and Bhojpuri, a tongue in the Bihari language group with almost 40 000 000 speakers, written in both the Devanagari and Kaithi scripts. danda situated at the bank of koyal river

Facilities
Market:   A small market called as  Danda bazar is situated in middle of the block.

See also
Garhwa district
Jharkhand

References

Garhwa district
Community development blocks in Jharkhand
Community development blocks in Garhwa district
Cities and towns in Garhwa district